Personopsis purpurata is a species of medium-sized sea snail, a marine gastropod mollusk in the family Personidae, the Distorsio snails.

Description
The length of the shell attains 15.6 mm.

Distribution
This marine species occurs off New Caledonia.

References

Personidae
Gastropods described in 1998